is a Japanese manga series written and illustrated by Daisuke Terasawa about a young boy cook. It was serialized in Kodansha's shōnen manga magazine Weekly Shōnen Magazine from 1986 to 1989, with its chapters collected in nineteen tankōbon volumes. 

It was adapted into a 99-episode anime television series by Sunrise, broadcast on TV Tokyo from October 1987 to September 1989. The series was pitched for broadcast on the Food Network in the United States.

Plot
Ajiyoshi Youichi is a culinary prodigy who manages a restaurant with his mother. One day, Murata Genjirou appears in the restaurant and is surprised at the delicious taste and delicate culinary skills of the katsu-don prepared by Youichi. Subsequently, Youichi is invited to the Ajiou (literally meaning taste emperor) Building in which he is involved in a spaghetti match with the in-house Italian chef, Marui. Youichi's novel culinary ideas, coupled with his enthusiasm of serving the best for his guests, allow him to defeat Marui in the match. From then on, Youichi begins to compete with other rivals in the race for the best tastes and dishes.

Characters

Hinode Eatery
It serves cheap, simple Japanese fare and is largely patronized by working-class people, but as Youichi defeats more and more opponents, the winning dishes are added to the menu periodically.

Youichi is the young head chef of his family's restaurant, he is passionately devoted to cooking and coming up with new and interesting culinary creations. His age was 14 when he first started (revealed when he entered the Tough Steak competition for a year's supply of Sirloin beef.) Showing a great level of cooking skill at a young age, Youichi's mother lets him take over cooking at the restaurant as she admits he's better than she is at it. He first encounters Murata Genjirou (usually referred to as Ajiou-sama) in the first volume/episode of the series when the surly company head stops in on a whim. After impressing him with a super-thick katsudon (pork cutlet), Ajiou invites Youichi to the Ajiou Building where through a series of comical events he runs afoul of the head of Ajiou's Italian cooking department, Chef Marui. After winning a spaghetti battle against the chef, Youichi's reputation as a "genius boy cook" becomes more widespread. He spends the rest of the series in a succession of cooking battles brought about by circumstance, direct challenges, or tournaments. He is strongly dedicated to Hinode, as well as his friends at school. However, this dedication and pride is also his main fault. He cannot take having Hinode or his skill as a cook insulted; and finds it impossible to back down from direct challenges. Youichi's mother calls this tendency his "sickness" and it gets him into trouble several times, all of which have to be resolved through cooking competitions. In the series, he only lost twice, once in an unofficial match, the other as to recreate his late father's signature dish.

Youichi's mother and the current owner of the Hinode Eatery after her husband died. Noriko runs everything about the restaurant except for the cooking which she leaves to her son, unless he has left on some cooking related trip. As she is a good cook herself, he often has her taste his dishes beforehand to get her opinion on what he has done. She remarks that Youichi is very much like her late husband in personality, as well has his passion for cooking and supports him whenever he has to go and compete.

Youichi's deceased father. It is never revealed exactly what he died of, but that it was about five years before the story starts. Takao was apparently known for being both an excellent chef and passionate about cooking. He left behind a book of recipes and cooking techniques that Youichi refers to in times of need, but it left out a page about a rare soup.

An anime original character. Youichi's classmate. Mitsuko works part-time at Hinode as a waitress in part as a favor to Youichi's mother and in part because she wants to be close to Youichi (who is largely unaware and uninterested in romance). She gets jealous if other girls take his attention. She is not a terribly good cook, but does her best to support Youichi and is often part of the group who taste tests his dishes. She only appears in the anime and is also there to help advance the explanation of whatever unusual cooking techniques are being used in the battle.

An anime original character. Shigeru is Mitsuko's little brother. He is 7 years old when he first appeared. He hangs out at the Hinode Eatery because he gets free food and he likes Youichi's cooking better than Mitsuko's. He also does a lot of taste testing and only appears in the anime. He is also an avid baseball fan.

Ajiou Company
The  is the largest conglomerate of chefs and cooks in the country. While it is never directly stated what the Ajiou Group does, it can be assumed they have restaurant chains, training schools, and other products related to cooking.

 - 

Head of the Ajiou group, it's stated that Ajiou-sama has been the head of the cooking world in Japan for the last thirty years. An accomplished chef with a discerning tongue, he oversees his empire directly and awards talent when he finds it. He is recognizable by his grey hair, beard, and mustache; and his Japanese style clothing. After he encounters Youichi, he becomes very interested in him, possibly as additional talent or a successor. He often shows up wherever Youichi is doing battle, sometimes going so far as to provide the facilities. He also decides to start holding the "Ajiou Company Grand Prix Contest", a cooking competition for young and upcoming chefs to quash any rumours of him retiring. Of the two times it is held in the manga, Youichi ties for the title in the first one and wins out right the second time.
/ 

Ajiou's personal secretary. He wears a suit and carries a brief case. He is responsible for accompanying Ajiou-sama wherever he goes, and presumably takes care of things like bills at restaurants and arranging transportation and such. His name means droopy eyes.

Head of the Italian cooking department at the Ajiou Company. He is a short, rotund man with a thick black mustache (the name Marui may be a nod to Mario, from the Super Mario Bros. game series). Marui meets Youichi when the boy is mistakenly put in his Italian cooking class where he upstages the famous chef over the best way to cook al dente pasta. In response, Marui demands a spaghetti battle between him and Youichi from Ajiou-sama. After he's beaten, Marui accepts defeat gracefully and becomes one of Youichi's strongest supporters, next to Ajiou-sama. He tends to check in and advise Youichi during the preparation before battles and has also helped out at Hinode while Youichi has been absent due to training or competitions. There are some small indications that he may be attracted to Noriko, but it is never explored in the manga. He returned to Italy after his 41st birthday, in a friendly battle against Youichi, but both defeated a robot. He is also the second person after Ajiou-sama to get the Golden Plate, 10 years before Youichi eventually got his.

Head of the French cooking department at the Ajiou Company. Shimonaka is much younger than the other department heads. He has blond hair that flips up at the bottom. He was formally trained in France and is the only member of the Ajiou Company department heads who competes in the GP Contest as a representative. He conceded defeat in the second round after his dish had too much leftover bones of a fish, and returns to France to train. Upon his return he is dead set on defeating Youichi, but ultimately while he comes to respect and consider Youichi a friend, he is never successful.

Head of the Japanese cooking department at the Ajiou Company. Shiba is an older gentleman with light hair that he wears brushed back. He also wears Japanese style clothing. Shiba is usually a judge during any of the battles involving the Ajiou Company and helps judge the last battle which is between Youichi and Ajiou-sama himself. His father is a squid shop vendor.

Head of the German cooking department at the Ajiou Company. Sekiba has short, dark, curly hair that is receding. He wears a cravat under a collared coat. Sekiba is another judge during any of the battles involving the Ajiou Company. Youichi helps him defend the Ajiou Company's reputation in a bratwurst battle.

Head of the Chinese cooking department at the Ajiou Company. Yonemoto has black hair and eyes that always look like they're closed. He tends to wear suits. He is the last of the judges during any of the battles involving the Ajiou Company.

Aji Shougun Group
The  is a less reputable company similar to Ajiou; bent on driving many of the local restaurants (including Hinode) in Youichi's neighborhood out of business, having already forced Youichi's father to close of his former business - a traditional Japanese floating teahouse. Though they make good food, they also try to use flashy decorations or gimmicks like trailer trucks to attract more customers. Whenever one of members of this group shows up, the restaurant shop owner in danger usually comes to Youichi for help.

Other rivals
Youichi has many one off battles over the course of the series, however; there are several chefs whom he faces multiple times and considers to be personal rivals.

Sakai is also considered to be a "genius boy chef" and his biggest peer rival. Like Youichi, he is short with dark hair, but is mainly recognizable by his one fang when he smiles or opens his mouth. Youichi first encounters him for the first time in defense of Hinode. Sakai is working for someone who wants to buy the building and put up a high rise food complex (who is also his legal guardian because he is also 14). The two compete in a curry battle, which Youichi wins by a clever use of pineapple and instant coffee. They face off several more times, including during both GP Contests. Youichi wins most of these matches, although they did tie for first in the first GP Contest. He ended up being inspired enough to open a curry shop next to Hinode. He was formerly a Yellow Plate holder for the best Custodian Chefs in Japan.

Konishi is an adult who has a specialty in cooking meat. He has shaggy dark hair and a large chin with a pronounced cleft in it. Youichi first runs into him during a steak contest (the winner would get a year's worth of steak for their restaurant). Konishi lost thanks to Youichi's clever use of a specially made heated steak plate. Angry and embarrassed, he vows to face Youichi again. They meet again at the GP Contest, where Konishi is the first to be eliminated. He takes this loss with a little more dignity and becomes one of the cast members who regularly appears to watch Youichi compete and occasionally help out at Hinode. He did become a member of Aji Shogun Group until he escaped and became a sushi chef apprentice.

Nakae is a man in his early twenties. Based in Kyuushu, he his very passionate and devoted to growing his own ingredients and making good food. Nakae is quite tall and bulky, with long dark hair and usually has a band aid over the bridge of his nose. Nakae differs from many of Youichi's other rivals in that he is very good natured and pleasant. In their first encounter, Nakae actually beats Youichi, but there is no ill will and they meet again in the second GP Contest, where he loses in the last round over a steak battle. Nakae also has a couple of friends who challenge Youichi, but both lose. He lost the battle to win the Red Plate (Best International Chef), Blue Plate (Best Sea-based Chef), Green (Best Herbal and Medical Chef), for the right to compete against Kazuma.

Ryuu is a 19 (holds a motorbike license, in which the minimum legal age is 18) and cooking prodigy from Hong Kong. Ryuu has spiky hair that is dark at the top and light at the bottom. He wears a white Chinese style coat. He and Youichi meet during a trip the latter takes to Hong Kong with a family friend. Ryuu and Youichi have one match up in Hong Kong which go either way, but he is eliminated in the second round of the second GP contest. He appears a couple times more, and once or twice actually assists Youichi in defeating Ryu's former master, who betrayed him.

Theme songs
 Opening theme: 
 Ending theme: 
 (Both) Song and composition: Wataru Kuniyasu / Lyrics: Ikki Matsumoto / Arrangement: Tatsumi Yano

References

External links
 

1986 manga
1987 anime television series debuts
Cooking in anime and manga
Kodansha manga
Shōnen manga
Seinen manga
Sunrise (company)
TV Tokyo original programming